The Times is a live EP from Canadian-American folk rock musician Neil Young. Released on September 18, 2020, the album is made up of live recordings that Young did in his home for the Fireside Sessions series.

Recording and release
The Fireside Sessions is a series of concerts that Young streamed online for fans to provide some solace during the COVID-19 pandemic. This EP was made available only via Young's site and Amazon Music HD for maximum audio quality.

Critical reception
Review aggregator Album of the Year characterizes critical consensus for The Times as a 73 out of 100 with three reviews. Writing for NME, Leonie Cooper gave the album four out of five stars, citing its relevance to ongoing Black Lives Matter protests and in opposition to the Donald Trump 2020 presidential campaign using Young's music. Vish Khanna of Exclaim! agrees that the music is timeless, which is why he finds it depressing, considering the political climate. His review gives The Times eight out of 10 for being "stark and haunting". The editorial staff of JamBase named it a new album highlight. Writing for AllMusic Guide, Stephen Thomas Erlewine, writing that the album is "designed to stir memories of past activism" and "it feels almost more nostalgic than modern", noting that "Young's voice quivers slightly and by supporting himself with just a guitar, he seems slightly fragile, a quality that gives these simple, straightforward covers a subtle new dimension." The editorial staff of the site gave it three out of five stars. Writing for Pitchfork Media, Jesse Jarnow gave the EP a 6.9 out of 10, praising the "lo-fi but distinctly modern starkness that stands in contrast to Young’s longstanding fixation on sound quality and love of vintage (and expensive) analog gear" and Young's "commitment to righteousness" but noting that the protest songs, "neither hit particularly hard as music". Rolling Stone included this release as one of the 18 picks for the month of September 2020.

Track listing
All songs written by Neil Young, except where noted.
"Alabama"– 3:00
"Campaigner"– 3:28
"Ohio"– 2:49
"The Times They Are A-Changin’" (Bob Dylan)– 5:01
"Lookin’ for a Leader"– 4:11
"Southern Man"– 3:32
"Little Wing"– 4:45

Personnel
Neil Young– guitar, vocals, harmonica, production
Niko Bolas– production
dhlovelife– photography, art direction, recording
Janice Heo– art direction assistance
Dana Neilsen– mastering

Charts

References

External links

Review from For Folk's Sake
Review from mxdwn

2020 EPs
Neil Young EPs
Albums produced by Neil Young
2020 live albums
Live EPs
Albums produced by Niko Bolas
Live lo-fi music albums
Lo-fi music EPs
Alternative rock albums by Canadian artists